The New Plymouth District is one of the districts of New Zealand within Taranaki. It includes the city of New Plymouth and smaller towns such as Inglewood, Ōakura and Waitara.

In 1989, as a part of New Zealand-wide reorganisation of local government, New Plymouth City Council was merged with North Taranaki District Council, Inglewood District Council, and Clifton County Council to form the New Plymouth District Council.

Demographics
The New Plymouth District is the 11th largest district (out of 67) in New Zealand.

New Plymouth District had a population of 80,679 at the 2018 New Zealand census, an increase of 6,495 people (8.8%) since the 2013 census, and an increase of 11,778 people (17.1%) since the 2006 census. There were 30,954 households, comprising 39,630 males and 41,049 females, giving a sex ratio of 0.97 males per female. The median age was 40.6 years (compared with 37.4 years nationally), with 16,428 people (20.4%) aged under 15 years, 13,650 (16.9%) aged 15 to 29, 36,129 (44.8%) aged 30 to 64, and 14,475 (17.9%) aged 65 or older.

Ethnicities were 85.4% European/Pākehā, 17.8% Māori, 2.2% Pacific peoples, 5.2% Asian, and 2.1% other ethnicities. People may identify with more than one ethnicity.

The percentage of people born overseas was 15.7, compared with 27.1% nationally.

Although some people chose not to answer the census's question about religious affiliation, 52.2% had no religion, 35.9% were Christian, 0.6% had Māori religious beliefs, 0.8% were Hindu, 0.5% were Muslim, 0.5% were Buddhist and 1.7% had other religions.

Of those at least 15 years old, 11,112 (17.3%) people had a bachelor's or higher degree, and 13,422 (20.9%) people had no formal qualifications. The median income was $30,400, compared with $31,800 nationally. 10,500 people (16.3%) earned over $70,000 compared to 17.2% nationally. The employment status of those at least 15 was that 30,669 (47.7%) people were employed full-time, 10,026 (15.6%) were part-time, and 2,472 (3.8%) were unemployed.

Local government
Every three years the Mayor, 14 councillors and 16 community board members are elected by the New Plymouth District’s enrolled voters. The full council, sub-committees and standing committees meet on a six-weekly cycle. The current serving Mayor of New Plymouth is Neil Holdom.

The Planning and Performance standing committees have delegated authority from the council to make final decisions on certain matters, and they make recommendations to the council on all others. The four community boards – Clifton, Waitara, Inglewood and Kaitake – as well as the subcommittees and working parties can make recommendations to the standing committees for them to consider.

The third standing committee, the Hearings Commission, is a quasi-judicial body that meets whenever a formal hearing is required – for instance, to hear submissions on a publicly notified resource consent application.

The Chief Executive and approximately 460 full-time equivalent staff provide advice and information to the elected members and the public, implement council decisions and manage the district’s day-to-day operations.

This includes everything from maintaining more than 280 parks and reserves, waste water management and issuing consents and permits, through to providing libraries and other recreational services and ensuring the district’s eateries meet health standards.

New Plymouth District Council's annual operating revenue for 2013/2014 is $167.18 million.

See also
Mayor of New Plymouth
Harry Duynhoven

References

External links

 New Plymouth District Council